Kentucky Route 2 is an east–west state highway extending 36.887 miles (59.361 km) across northeast Kentucky. The western terminus of the route is at U.S. Route 60 (US 60) in Olive Hill, Carter County. The eastern terminus is at Kentucky Route 2541 in Greenup, Greenup County a short distance east of US 23.

Route description
Starting at US 60 in Olive Hill, KY 2 meanders northwestward. As the route meets I-64 at a diamond interchange and KY 59 after that, it then meanders northeastward. On its way, it meets KY 1704, then KY 1025, then Wesleyville, then KY 182 (which forms a brief concurrency with KY 2), KY 396, and then KY 474 in Carter. East of Carter, it then begins to run concurrently with KY 7. Going further northeast, they then meet KY 9 (AA Highway), then KY 1773, and then KY 784. After that, both routes split off in a different direction, ending the concurrency. For KY 2, it then intersects KY 1459, KY 3307, KY 2433, and US 23. Going further, the route ends at KY 2541 in Greenup.

Major intersections

References

Further reading
 
 

0002
0002
0002